The 2022 BYU Cougars baseball team represented Brigham Young University during the 2022 NCAA Division I baseball season.  Mike Littlewood began the season as acting head coach of the Cougars for a tenth consecutive season. However, on April 11 Littlewood announced he was stepping away from BYU Baseball due to personal reasons that were undisclosed. Assistant coach Trent Pratt was named acting head coaching for the remainder of the season. 

With 22 players returning this season the Cougars were picked to finish second in the WCC Pre-season poll. To conclude the season the WCC hosted the 2022 baseball tournament May 24–28 at Banner Island Ballpark. For the first time in WCC history the tournament expanded to 6 teams. Teams 1 and 2 received byes into the double elimination bracket while 3 played 6 and 4 played 5 in a single elimination first round. 

BYU qualified for the tournament as the #4 seed. However the Cougars fell in the tournament's first-round single-elimination game 5–1 to finish the season 33–21, 17–12 under Littlewood and 16–9 under Pratt.

On June 8 BYU removed the interim title from Pratt and announced he'd be the new BYU baseball head coach for future seasons.

2022 roster

Schedule 

! style=""| Regular Season
|- 

|- align="center" bgcolor="ffbbb"
| February 18 || vs. Indiana State || – || Centennial Park  || FloBaseball || 2–3 || Matt Jachec (1–0) || Jack Sterner (0–1) || Connor Fenlong (1) || N/A || 0–1 || –
|- align="center" bgcolor="ffbbb"
| February 19 || vs. Marshall || – || Centennial Park || FloBaseball || 3–6 || Louis Davenport (1–0) || Nate Dahle (0–1) || None || N/A || 0–2 || –
|- align="center" bgcolor="ccffcc"
| February 19 || vs. Marshall || – || Centennial Park || FloBaseball || 3–2 || Janzen Keisel (1–0) || Zac Addkison (0–1) || Reid McLaughlin (1) || N/A || 1–2 || –
|- align="center" bgcolor="ccffcc"
| February 21 || vs. Ohio State || – || Centennial Park  || FloBaseball || 9–6 || Justis Reiser (1–0) || Aaron Funk (0–1) || Reid McLaughlin (2) || N/A || 2–2 || –
|- align="center" bgcolor="ccffcc"
| February 24 || at Arizona State || – || Phoenix Municipal Stadium  || P12+ ASU || 4–2 || Bryce Robison (1–0)  || Christian Bodlovich (0–1) || Reid McLaughlin (3) || 2,725 || 3–2 || –
|- align="center" bgcolor="ccffcc"
| February 25 || at Arizona State || – || Phoenix Municipal Stadium || P12 AZ || 6–5 || Peyton Cole (1–0) || Brock Peery (0–1) || Reid McLaughlin (4) || 3,388 || 4–2 || –
|- align="center" bgcolor="ccffcc"
| February 26 || at Arizona State || – || Phoenix Municipal Stadium || P12+ ASU || 19–3 || Ryan Brady (1–0) || Josh Hansell (0–1) || None || 3,872 || 5–2 || –
|-

|- align="center" bgcolor="ccffcc"
| March 3 || Milwaukee || – || Larry H. Miller Field || byutv.org || 6–5 || Reid McLaughlin (1–0) || Mike Edwards (0–1) || None || 1,100 || 6–2 || –
|- align="center" bgcolor="ffbbb"
| March 3 || Milwaukee || – || Larry H. Miller Field  || byutv.org || 0–2 || Nick Gilhaus (1–0) || Nate Dahle (0–2) || AJ Blubaugh (1) || 1,100 || 6–3 || –
|- align="center" bgcolor="ccffcc"
| March 4 || Milwaukee || – || Larry H. Miller Field  || byutv.org || 8–4 || Janzen Keisel (2–0) || Johnny Kelliher (0–1) || None || 1,167 || 7–3 || –
|- align="center" bgcolor="ccffcc"
| March 10 || vs. #6 Oklahoma State || – || Globe Life Field  || Facebook || 8–6 || Bryce Robison (2–0) || Victor Mederos (0–1) || Reid McLaughlin (5) || 498 || 8–3 || –
|- align="center" bgcolor="ffbbb"
| March 11 || vs. #6 Oklahoma State || – || Globe Life Field  || Facebook || 0–3 || Kale Davis (1–1) || Justis Reiser (1–1) || Trevor Martin (3) || 705 || 8–4 || –
|- align="center" bgcolor="ffbbb"
| March 12 || vs. #6 Oklahoma State || – || Globe Life Field  || Facebook || 5–8 || Roman Phansalkar (3–2) || Nate Dahle (0–3) || Trevor Martin (4) || 1,062 || 8–5 || –
|- align="center" bgcolor="ccffcc"
| March 15 || at Utah || – || Smith's Ballpark || P12+ UT || 10–3 || Bryce Robison (3–0) || David Watson (0–1) || None || 2,084 || 9–5 || –
|- align="center" bgcolor="ccffcc"
| March 17 || at Portland* || – || Joe Etzel Field  || WCC Net  || 6–2 || Jack Sterner (1–1) || Caleb Franzen (1–3) || None || 231 || 10–5 || 1–0
|- align="center" bgcolor="ffbbb"
| March 18 || at Portland* || – || Joe Etzel Field || WCC Net  || 1–11 || Brett Gillis (4–1) || Janzen Keisel (2–1) || None || 307 || 10–6 || 1–1
|- align="center" bgcolor="ffbbb"
| March 19 || at Portland* || – || Joe Etzel Field  || WCC Net || 1–3 || Eli Morse (4–0) || Ryan Brady (1–1) || Peter Allegro (6) || 309 || 10–7 || 1–2 
|- align="center" bgcolor="ccffcc"
| March 22 || at Utah Valley || – || UCCU Ballpark || ESPN+ || 12–5 || Bryce Robison (4–0) || Caneron Scudder (0–1) || None || 1,676 || 11–7 || –
|- align="center" bgcolor="ccffcc"
| March 24 || #24 Gonzaga* || – || Larry H. Miller Field  || byutv.org || 11–2 || Jack Sterner (2–1) || Gabriel Hughes (4–1) || None || 1,884 || 12–7 || 2–2
|- align="center" bgcolor="ffbbb"
| March 25 || #24 Gonzaga* || – || Larry H. Miller Field  || BYUtv || 3–6 || Brody Jessee (3–0) || Janzen Keisel (2–2) || None || 2,113 || 12–8 || 2–3  
|- align="center" bgcolor="ffbbb"
| March 26 || #24 Gonzaga* || – || Larry H. Miller Field  || BYUtv || 4–9 || Trystan Vrieling (3–1) || Ryan Brady (1–2) || None || 2,373 || 12–9 || 2–4
|- align="center" bgcolor="ccffcc"
| March 29 || Washington State || – || Larry H. Miller Field  || byutv.org || 9–3 || Justis Reiser (2–1) || Cam Liss (0–1) || None || 385 || 13–9 || –  
|- align="center" bgcolor="ffbbb"
| March 31 || at Saint Mary's* || – || Louis Guisto Field  || SCS Central || 3–4 || Jackson Hulett (3–1) || Reid McLaughlin (1–1) || None || 111 || 13–10 || 2–5
|-

|- align="center" bgcolor="ccffcc"
| April 1 || at Saint Mary's* || – || Louis Guisto Field  || SCS Pacific || 12–2 || Ryan Brady (2–2) || Ryan Taurek (1–2) || Bryce Robison (1) || 97 || 14–10 || 3–5
|- align="center" bgcolor="ffbbb"
| April 2 || at Saint Mary's* || – || Louis Guisto Field  || SCS Central || 3–4 || Ryan Sanders (3–1) || Nate Dahle (0–4) || Nathan Schneider (1) || 242 || 14–11 || 3–6
|- align="center" bgcolor="ffbbb"
| April 5 || at Dixie State || – || Bruce Hurst Field || ESPN+ || 5–7 || Jake Dahle (2–2) || Boston Maebus (0–1) || None || 1,951 || 14–12 || –
|- align="center" bgcolor="ccffcc"
| April 7 || Santa Clara* || – || Larry H. Miller Field || byutv.org || 5–1 || Jack Sterner (3–1) || Cole Kitchen (3–2) || None || 1,857 || 15–12 || 4–6
|- align="center" bgcolor="ccffcc"
| April 8 || Santa Clara* || – || Larry H. Miller Field || byutv.org || 10–0 || Bryce Robison (5–0) || Nick Sando (3–2) || None || 2,674 || 16–12 || 5–6
|- align="center" bgcolor="ccffcc"
| April 9 || Santa Clara* || – || Larry H. Miller Field || byutv.org || 9–5 || Cy Nielson (1–0) || Jared Feikes (5–2) || None || 2,167 || 17–12 || 6–6
|- align="center" bgcolor="ffbbb"
| April 14 || at Nebraska || – || Haymarket Park || B1G+ || 0–1 || Tyler Martin (2–0) || Jack Sterner (3–2) || Braxton Bragg (3) || 4,382 || 17–13 || –
|- align="center" bgcolor="ccffcc"
| April 15 || at Nebraska || – || Haymarket Park || B1G+ || 3–2 || Cy Nielson (2–0) || Shay Schanaman (2–5) || Reid McLaughlin (6) || 5,219 || 18–13 || –
|- align="center" bgcolor="ccffcc"
| April 15 || at Nebraska || – || Haymarket Park || B1G+ || 7–6 || Carter Smith (1–0) || Braxton Bragg (1–4) || Nate Dahle (1) || 5,219 || 19–13 || –
|- align="center" bgcolor="ccffcc"
| April 16 || at Nebraska || – || Haymarket Park  || B1G+ || 4–3 || Cooper McKeehan (1–0) || Corbin Hawkins (0–1) || Reid McLaughlin (7) || 5,005 || 20–13 || –
|- align="center" bgcolor="ffbbb"
| April 19 || at Utah || – || Smith's Ballpark  || P12 || 7–8 || Micah Ashman (2–0) || Reid McLaughlin (1–2) || None || 1,626 || 20–14 || –
|- align="center" bgcolor="ccffcc"
| April 21 || San Diego* || – || Larry H. Miller Field || byutv.org || 11–7 || Jack Sterner (4–2) || Garrett Rennie (2–4) || None || 1,859 || 21–14 || 7–6
|- align="center" bgcolor="ffbbb"
| April 22 || San Diego* || – || Larry H. Miller Field || BYUtv || 3–8 || Kyle Carr (1–0) || Ryan Brady (2–3) || None || 1,317 || 21–15 || 7–7
|- align="center" bgcolor="ffbbb"
| April 23 || San Diego* || – || Larry H. Miller Field || BYUtv || 3–4 || Brycen Mautz (7–1) || Bryce Robison (5–1) || Ryan Kysar (1) || 1,884 || 21–16 || 7–8
|- align="center" bgcolor="ccffcc"
| April 26 || Utah Valley || – || Larry H. Miller Field || byutv.org || 7–0 || Peyton Cole (2–0) || Luke McCollough (2–2) || None || 2,125 || 22–16 || –
|- align="center" bgcolor="ffbbb"
| April 28 || at San Francisco* || – || Dante Benedetti Diamond at Max Ulrich Field  || SCS Atlantic || 3–8 || Jonah Jenkins (1–3) || Jack Sterner (4–3) || None || 178 || 22–17 || 7–9
|- align="center" bgcolor="ffbbb"
| April 29 || at San Francisco* || – || Dante Benedetti Diamond at Max Ulrich Field || SCS Pacific || 8–9 || Adam Shew (3–1) || Cooper McKeehan (1–1) || Josh Mollerus (4) || 213 || 22–18 || 7–10
|- align="center" bgcolor="ccffcc"
| April 30 || at San Francisco* || – || Dante Benedetti Diamond at Max Ulrich Field || SCS Atlantic || 12–4 || Bryce Robison (6–1) || Jesse Barron (4–3) || None || 300 || 23–18 || 8–10
|-

|- align="center" bgcolor="ccffcc"
| May 3 || at Cal State Fullerton || – || Goodwin Field  || ESPN+ || 10–5 || Ayden Callahan (1–0) || Grant Kelly (0–1) || None || 868 || 24–18 || –
|- align="center" bgcolor="ccffcc"
| May 5 || at Pepperdine* || – || Eddy D. Field Stadium  || SCS Pacific || 4–2 || Cy Neilson (3–0) || Brandon Llewellyn (3–6) || Nate Dahle (2) || 376 || 25–18 || 9–10
|- align="center" bgcolor="ccffcc"
| May 6 || at Pepperdine* || – || Eddy D. Field Stadium || WCC Net || 6–3 || Ayden Callahan (2–0) || Bobby Christy (0–1) || Reid McLaughlin (8) || 476 || 26–18 || 10–10
|- align="center" bgcolor="ccffcc"
| May 7 || at Pepperdine* || – || Eddy D. Field Stadium || SCS Atlantic || 4–2 || Nate Dahle (1–4) || Jack Chester (0–1) || Reid McLaughlin (9) || 489 || 27–18 || 11–10
|- align="center" bgcolor="ccffcc"
| May 10 || Dixie State || – || Larry H. Miller Field || byutv.org || 3–2 || Janzen Keisel (3–2) || Jacob Taggart (0–2) || Reid McLaughlin (10) || 2,192 || 28–18 || –
|- align="center" bgcolor="ccffcc"
| May 12 || Pacific* || – || Larry H. Miller Field || ESPNU || 8–7 (12) || Cooper McKeehan (2–1) || Austin McKinney (0–2) || None || 1,507 || 29–18 || 12–10
|- align="center" bgcolor="ccffcc"
| May 13 || Pacific* || – || Larry H. Miller Field || byutv.org || 9–3 || Bryce Robison (7–1) || Hunter Hayes (2–9) || None || 1,934 || 30–18 || 13–10
|- align="center" bgcolor="ccffcc"
|May 14 || Pacific* || – || Larry H. Miller Field || BYUtv || 5–0 || Ryan Brady (3–3) || Marv Guarin (1–4) || None || 2,312 || 31–18 || 14–10
|- align="center" bgcolor="ffbbb"
|May 17 || Utah || – || Larry H. Miller Field || byutv.org || 7–12 || Bryson Van Sickle (3–0) || Peyton Cole (2–1) || None || 3,192 || 31–19 || –
|- align="center" bgcolor="ccffcc"
|May 19 ||  || – || Larry H. Miller Field || byutv.org || 4–3 (10) || Nate Dahle (4–2) || Quinn Lavelle (0–5) || None || 1,688 || 32–19 || 15–10
|- align="center" bgcolor="ccffcc"
|May 20 ||  || – || Larry H. Miller Field || BYUtv || 9–3 || Ryan Brady (4–3) || Jimmy Galica (1–6) || None || 2,780 || 33–19 || 16–10
|- align="center" bgcolor="ffbbb"
|May 21 ||  || – || Larry H. Miller Field || BYUtv || 7–17 || Quinn Lavelle (1–5) || Ayden Callahan (2–1) || None || 2,816 || 33–20 || 16–11
|-

|- align="center" bgcolor="ffbbb"
|May 24 ||  || – || Banner Island Ballpark || SCS Atlantic ||  1–5 || Diego Barrera (4–3) || Jack Sterner (4–4) || Owen Hackman (5) || 586 || 33–21 || –
|-

| style="font-size:88%" | Rankings from Collegiate Baseball. Parenthesis indicate tournament seedings.*West Coast Conference games

Rivalries
BYU had two main rivalries on their schedule- the Deseret First Duel vs. Utah and the UCCU Crosstown Clash vs. Utah Valley. Dixie State also played the Cougars for a second consecutive season.

Radio Information
BYU Baseball was once again broadcast as part of the NuSkin BYU Sports Network. BYU Radio 107.9 KUMT served as the flagship station. However, because of some conflicts, some radio broadcasts were App exclusives. Jason Shepherd and Greg Wrubell rotated providing play-by-play. Tuckett Slade served as analyst on most broadcasts.

TV Announcers
Indiana State: No commentary
Marshall: No commentary
Marshall: No commentary
Ohio State: No commentary
Arizona State: Matt Venezia & Zach Woolley
Arizona State: Dominic Cotroneo
Arizona State: Gareth Kwok & Randy Policar
Milwaukee: Greg Wrubell & Tuckett Slade 
Milwaukee: Greg Wrubell  & Tuckett Slade
Milwaukee: Jason Shepherd & Tuckett Slade
Oklahoma State: Greg Wrubell  & Tuckett Slade
Oklahoma State: Greg Wrubell  & Tuckett Slade
Oklahoma State: Greg Wrubell  & Tuckett Slade
Utah: Brian Preece
Portland: Bryan Sleik & Korey Kier
Portland: Bryan Sleik & Korey Kier
Portland: Bryan Sleik
Utah Valley: Jordan Bianucci & Josh Kallunki
Gonzaga: Dave McCann, Gary Sheide, & Jason Shepherd
Gonzaga: Dave McCann & Gary Sheide
Gonzaga: Dave McCann & Gary Sheide
Washington State: Dave McCann & Gary Sheide
Saint Mary's: Ben Ross & Tim Fitzgerald 
Saint Mary's: Tim Fitzgerald
Saint Mary's: Brian Brownfield & Tim Fitzgerald
Dixie State: Keric Seegmiller
Santa Clara: Jason Shepherd & Gary Sheide 
Santa Clara: Dave McCann, Gary Sheide, & Jason Shepherd
Santa Clara: Dave McCann, Gary Sheide, & Jason Shepherd
Nebraska: Grant Hansen & Bobby Hessling
Nebraska DH: Connor Clark & Josh Lill
Nebraska: Ryan Valenta & Andrew Pfeifer
Utah: Thad Anderson & Donnie Marbut
San Diego: Dave McCann, Gary Sheide, & Jason Shepherd
San Diego: Dave McCann, Gary Sheide, & Jason Shepherd
San Diego: Dave McCann, Gary Sheide, & Jason Shepherd
Utah Valley: Dave McCann, Gary Sheide, & Jason Shepherd
San Francisco: Alex Hutton
San Francisco: Ben Ross
San Francisco: Pat Olson
Cal State Fullerton: Michael Martinez
Pepperdine: Al Epstein
Pepperdine: Al Epstein
Pepperdine: Karl Winter & Austin Hall
Dixie State: Dave McCann & Gary Sheide
Pacific: Roy Philpott & Roddy Jones
Pacific: Dave McCann, Gary Sheide, & Jason Shepherd
Pacific: Dave McCann, Gary Sheide, & Jason Shepherd
Utah: Spencer Linton, Gary Sheide, & Jason Shepherd
Loyola Marymount: Dave McCann, Gary Sheide, & Jason Shepherd
Loyola Marymount: Dave McCann, Gary Sheide, & Jason Shepherd
Loyola Marymount: Dave McCann, Gary Sheide, & Jason Shepherd
Loyola Marymount: Steve Quis & Bryan Sleik

See also 
 2021 BYU Cougars football team
 2021–22 BYU Cougars men's basketball team
 2021–22 BYU Cougars women's basketball team
 2021 BYU Cougars women's soccer team
 2021 BYU Cougars women's volleyball team
 2022 BYU Cougars men's volleyball team
 2022 BYU Cougars softball team

References 

2022 West Coast Conference baseball season
2022 team
2022 in sports in Utah